Aime is an Estonian feminine given name.

As of 1 January 2022, 1,761 women in Estonia have the first name Aime, making it the 95th most popular female name in the country. The name is most commonly found in Järva County, where 27.67 per 10,000 inhabitants of the county. bear the name. Individuals bearing the name Aime include:

 (born 1928), Estonian sculptor
Aime Hansen (born 1962), Estonian poet, writer, and artist
 (1947-2013), Estonian actress, director and playwright
Aime Mäemets (1930–1996), Estonian botanist and hydrobiologist
 (born 1934), Estonian writer
 (born 1945), Estonian technical scientist
Aime Sügis (born 1935), Estonian chemist and politician

References

Feminine given names
Estonian feminine given names